The Bedford Incident is a 1965 British-American Cold War film directed by James B. Harris, starring Richard Widmark and Sidney Poitier, and produced by Harris and Widmark. The cast also features Eric Portman, James MacArthur, Martin Balsam, and Wally Cox, as well as early appearances by Donald Sutherland and Ed Bishop. James Poe adapted Mark Rascovich's 1963 novel of the same name, which borrowed from the plot of Herman Melville's Moby-Dick; at one point in the film, the captain is advised he is "not chasing whales now".

At the time The Bedford Incident was produced, Harris was best known as the producer of three of Stanley Kubrick's films. The two parted ways when Kubrick decided to make Dr. Strangelove as a satirical black comedy, rather than a dramatic thriller, but Harris remained focused on developing a serious nuclear-confrontation film, and The Bedford Incident was released less than two years after Dr. Strangelove.

Plot
The United States Navy destroyer USS Bedford, under the strict command of Captain Eric Finlander, is sailing in the Greenland, Iceland, and United Kingdom gap. Aboard are Ben Munceford, a civilian photojournalist; Commodore Wolfgang Schrepke, a German Navy NATO naval advisor; Ensign Ralston, an inexperienced young officer who is constantly criticized by Finlander for small errors; and Lieutenant Commander Chester Potter, the ship's new doctor.

When the Bedford detects a Soviet Navy submarine just off the coast of Greenland, Finlander mercilessly stalks his prey into international waters and plays a waiting game after losing sonar contact in a field of icebergs, knowing the diesel-powered sub will have to surface within 24 hours to replenish its air and recharge its batteries. The crew never complains, but Potter is concerned that maintaining this level of vigilance is dangerous and suggests modifications, all of which Finlander dismisses out of hand.

Munceford is aboard to photograph life on a Navy destroyer, but his real interest is Finlander, who was one of the only military officials to publicly state that the United States should have used greater force during the Cuban Missile Crisis. When Munceford asks Finlander if this is why, though he gets results, he was recently passed over for promotion to admiral, Finlander becomes hostile and accuses Munceford of misinterpreting the facts. He says he would go "all the way" to save his country, but, after calming down, insists his current action is just a deterrent.

The submarine is spotted by the Bedfords radar when it finally pokes its snorkel above the surface. It was not seen first by the sonarman because he is having exhaustion-induced delusions. Schrepke reminds Finlander that his orders are just to escort the sub out of Greenland's waters, but Finlander sends a message ordering the sub to fully surface and identify itself. When the order is ignored, Finlander runs over the snorkel. Munceford and Schrepke protest that Finlander is forcing the sub to fight, and Finlander orders Ralston to arm an anti-submarine rocket. He reassures Munceford and Schrepke that he will not fire first, but when he says that "if he fires one, I'll fire one", the fatigued Ralston just hears "fire one" and launches the rocket.

Before it is destroyed, the submarine launches four nuclear torpedoes. Although Finlander orders evasive maneuvers and countermeasures, the torpedoes continue to home-in on the Bedford. Finlander silently leaves the bridge, followed by Munceford, who frantically pleads for him to do something. The captain looks away sheepishly, and the Bedford and her crew are vaporized in an atomic blast, resulting in a mushroom cloud.

Cast

Production

Writing
The story reflects several real Cold War incidents between the NATO and Soviet navies, including one in 1957 when the USS Gudgeon, a submarine, was caught in Soviet waters and chased out to sea by Soviet warships. Although none of these real-life incidents ended as catastrophically as the Bedford incident, the story illustrated many of the fears of the time.

The screenplay by James Poe follows the novel fairly closely, but Poe wrote a different ending. In the novel, the Soviet submarine does not fire back at the Bedford before being destroyed. The shocked Finlander receives word of his promotion to admiral. Commodore Schrepke, realising the incident will spark World War III, sabotages one of the remaining ASROCs and destroys the ship. Munceford, the sole survivor, is found by Novosibirsk, the submarine's mothership.

Filming
Although some shots in the film were recorded at sea, The Bedford Incident was mostly filmed at Shepperton Studios in the United Kingdom. The "USS Bedford" is a fictitious guided missile destroyer, and the role of Bedford was mostly played by a large model of a Farragut-class destroyer. Interior scenes were filmed in the British Type 15 frigate ; the Troubridge'''s novel, forward-sloping bridge windows can be seen in some shots, as can British military equipment, such as a rack of Lee-Enfield rifles. Poitier and Balsam's initial flypast and landing from a Whirlwind helicopter were filmed aboard another Type 15 frigate, whose pennant number of "F159" is clearly visible in the scene. The vessel portraying a Soviet intelligence ship has the name "Novo Sibursk", written on the hull at the bow in the Latin alphabet (rather than the Russian language's Cyrillic alphabet), though "Novosibirsk" would have been a more accurate rendering.

Reception
Bosley Crowther of The New York Times wrote that "the whole thing transcends plausibility [...] because of its gross exaggeration of a highly improbable episode. [...] the blame for this climactic blooper must be lodged against James Poe, who wrote the script from a novel by Mark Rascovich."

Analysis

The American historian Stephen J. Whitfield argued that The Bedford Incident was a rejoinder to The Caine Mutiny. In the 1954 film The Caine Mutiny, and even more so in the 1951 novel that it was adapted from, the incompetent, deranged Captain Philip Queeg, whose actions provoked the eponymous mutiny, is ultimately portrayed as a victim of the snide, scheming intellectual Thomas Keefer, whose ethos is fundamentally opposed to that of the U.S Navy. The message of both versions of The Caine Mutiny was, as Whitfield put it, "that losing a ship in a typhoon is better than challenging a skipper whose powers of command have failed". Whitfield argued that popular mentalities had changed so much by the 1960s that more anti-militaristic films, such as The Bedford Incident, were being released. Very much like Captain Queeg of the fictional destroyer USS Caine, Finlander is a career Navy officer in command of a destroyer, who has "lost touch with reality, largely because of the constant frustration and remorseless pressure of command". In contrast to The Caine Mutiny, which "attempted to vindicate the necessity of obedience—even when that leadership is mentally unbalanced—The Bedford Incident, made without Navy co-operation, warns that such deranged authority could unleash nuclear war, which happens accidentally".

Keefer, the resident intellectual aboard the Caine, starts out as the likeable voice of reason against the paranoid Captain Queeg, but is gradually revealed to be the most loathsome character in the story, being a cowardly, dishonest, and selfish schemer who is admonished for his treatment of Queeg, who is praised as an honorable, but misunderstood, career Navy officer who was only patriotically serving his country. It is revealed that Queeg was suffering from post-traumatic stress caused by his service as a destroyer captain on the harrowing "North Atlantic run", making Keefer, who has never experienced combat, all the more odious. Ben Munceford, the journalist, serves as an analogous character to Keefer as the resident intellectual aboard the Bedford who has a worldview that is essentially opposed to that of the Navy, but he is portrayed as a far more sympathetic and likeable character. Unlike Keefer, the writer who was reluctantly drafted into the U.S. Navy during World War II, Munceford is a journalist, being the only civilian aboard the Bedford. However, Keefer and Munceford have similar short term expectations of the Navy, as Keefer is writing a novel aboard the Caine that he intends to publish after he is discharged, while Munceford is only on the Bedford to write a story about Finlander. Both Keefer and Munceford are intellectuals who are skeptical of authority figures and are always asking inconvenient questions. Keefer successfully undermines the leadership of Queeg and provokes the mutiny, while Munceford is unsuccessful in challenging the leadership of Finlander, leading the latter to embark upon a course that leads to the deaths of everyone aboard the Bedford. Munceford comes to serve as the voice of reason against Finlander, and in both the novel and film he is portrayed as quite justified in challenging Captain Finlander. Whitfield argued that the different messages presented about obeying authority and the portrayal of the military men and intellectuals in The Caine Mutiny vs. The Bedford Incident illustrated how much mentalities had changed from the 1950s to the 1960s.

Widmark, a political left wing liberal, modeled the mannerisms and rhetorical style of Captain Finlander after Senator Barry Goldwater, who was the Republican candidate in the 1964 United States presidential election. Goldwater had been attacked during his campaign as being too hawkish, most notably in Lyndon B. Johnson's infamous Daisy Girl television commercial, which warned that, if elected, Goldwater would start a nuclear war. The film's message—told via the story of Finlander, whose obsessive anti-Communism and relentless determination to provoke a confrontation with a Soviet submarine leads to the deaths of everyone on both the Bedford and the sub—is that Cold Warriors like Goldwater could provoke a nuclear war that would be the end of humanity. This criticism of hawkish, confrontational Cold War policies was part of a backlash against militarism after the Cuban Missile Crisis almost caused a nuclear war between the Soviet Union and the United States in 1962. The scholars Harold R. Troper and Michael J. Strada described The Bedford Incident as one of a series of films in the 1960s that were "full frontal assaults on military values".

The Canadian historian Sean Maloney praised the book The Bedford Incident for its level of realism, calling it "a microhistorical study of the Cold War itself", and "the best literary depiction of the Cold War". Maloney noted that, to enter the northern Atlantic Ocean from their bases on the Arctic Ocean in Murmansk and Arkhangelsk, Soviet submarines had to cross what was called the "Greenland-Iceland-UK gap", making patrolling the gap a key concern for the U.S. Navy in the Cold War. When Munceford arrives on the Bedford, the ship's executive officer (the number two man), Commander Allison, tells him that the ship operates "under virtually wartime conditions", a point further elaborated on by Captain Finlander, who says: "We are hunters—stalking kind of hunters—who track a foe who is also silently listening to us". On average, one Soviet nuclear ballistic submarine carried 12-16 Intercontinental ballistic missiles (ICBMs) armed with hydrogen bombs, each of which was capable of destroying an entire city. From Finlander's viewpoint, it was essential to know the location of the Soviet submarine because, if World War III should break out, he would have, at most, a matter of minutes to sink the submarine before it fired its ICBMs and took out 12-16 American cities. Maloney noted that, in the film version of The Bedford Incident, Finlander is portrayed as far more deranged than in the novel, saying that Finlander's obsession with hunting Soviet submarines in the North Atlantic in the novel is "completely understandable and possibly even legitimate". He argued that, should World War III ever occur, it was crucial to have as much intelligence as possible about the opponent in order to strike as hard as possible via nuclear strikes and deny the opponent the ability to strike with their nuclear weapons.

The fact that submarines are very difficult to find in the vastness of the ocean has imposed an almost unbearable psychological strain on Finlander. When Munceford presses for more information about what is going on and if anybody gets hurt, Finlander says: "Fear hurts. Unrelenting tension becomes a physical pain. Uncertainty and frustration can turn into a crippling agony. Here we clash in the privacy of the black, empty ocean with no audience, but our conscience; both parties want to keep it that way because the stakes are such that no compromise is possible. If you doubt me, then ask yourself what the United States has left if its DEW and NORAD systems are cracked?" Finlander further underlines the stakes when he says: "We're not here making faces at the Commies over a wall. We're not here in a base area indoctrinating simple-minded peasants into the complex savagery of modern guerrilla tactics; we're not sitting in an air conditioned blockhouse in Florida trying to shoot a bigger hole in the Moon, weather permitting. Here we hunt the Russians. Here we have our enemy and more than accepting his challenge, go after him without any inhibitions of containment policies or technical inferiorities". Maloney argued that the level of technical detail in the novel, together with its picture of American naval officers on a destroyer who must obsess over the location of Soviet submarines for every single minute of their patrol, is the most authentic picture of the Cold War at sea ever portrayed. Likewise, Finlander's final rant after the Bedford sinks the Soviet submarine reflects the frustration that many American naval officers felt with the Cold War, as he says: "The Cold War! How can governments expect their military to guide their actions by such a blatantly sordid euphemism? Is there really such a thing possible as a half-war? Can one half-fight with deadly weapons? Did those Russian submariners half-threaten us? Are they now only half-dead down there? Should I have only half-feared them when the crews of so many American ships and planes are totally dead as a result of Russian actions? Does it not all naturally culminate in the totality of death and destruction?...Look and see what the Cold War really is. The same as any war. Death". When Finlander tries to justify sinking the sub by saying that "war is hell", Commodore Schrepke replies: "a nuclear hell, Erik?", warning that his actions will set off a third World War that will be the end of humanity.

Maloney has argued that both the book and film versions of The Bedford Incident were inspired by two actual incidents: the "hold-downs" (forced surfacing) of four Soviet submarines during the Cuban Missile Crisis in 1962, and another incident in 1959 when an American destroyer staged a "hold-down" of a Soviet submarine off the coast of Greenland. The author of The Bedford Incident, Mark Rascovich, had many contacts within the U.S Navy and seems to have learned of the two incidents, which inspired the book. In the film, Munceford talks about how Finlander forced a Soviet submarine to surface during "the Cuban deal". In many ways, the film is similar to other submarine vs. destroyer films, such as Run Silent, Run Deep and The Enemy Below, but, unlike those, it is set in peacetime, and the nuclear component greatly raises the stakes. Maloney wrote that "The Bedford Incident is remarkably accurate in its assumptions that Soviet submarines were equipped with nuclear torpedoes on a routine basis". The Caine Mutiny is set during World War II, but its picture of a destroyer commanded by an officer who has lost his mind greatly influenced several novelists during the Cold War, who speculated about the possibility of a crazed naval officer trying to start World War III, either intentionally or by accident. In 1963, the South African novelist Antony Trew published Two Hours To Darkness, a bestselling novel about the HMS Retaliate, a fictional British nuclear ballistic submarine commanded by Captain Shadde, an officer suffering from paranoia caused by undiagnosed post-traumatic stress (like Captain Queeg) who is determined to fire his submarine's ICBMs at the Soviet Union. As in The Caine Mutiny and The Bedford Incident, the other officers aboard the Retaliate have to decide whether to obey a mentally ill commanding officer or reject his authority.

Another inspiration for The Bedford Incident was the desire of General Douglas MacArthur to expand the Korean War in 1951 by using nuclear weapons against the People's Republic of China—in defiance of President Harry S. Truman, if necessary. MacArthur's very public defiance led Truman to sack him in April 1951, stating that, as president, he had the final authority over whether to use nuclear weapons, and he had decided not to use them against China. MacArthur argued he was answerable only to God, not the president, and, as there is "no substitute for victory", nuclear weapons should be used against China. These sentiments inspired fears of an "out of control" military leader determined to plunge the world into a nuclear war, either by design, or by acting rashly. Maloney noted that many prominent American intellectuals, such as Joseph Heller, Harry Harrison, James Jones, and Norman Mailer, having been drafted into the military during World War II and exposed to military life first-hand, lashed out in the 1950s-60s by writing novels that portrayed American military leaders as stupid and vicious. A recurring theme of the writings of the American intelligentsia during the Cold War was the fear of a rogue officer acting recklessly (at least) and exposing the world to the risk of a nuclear armageddon.

Actual Cold War incident
In October 1962, at the height of the Cuban Missile Crisis, the Soviet submarine B-59 was pursued in the Atlantic Ocean by the U.S. Navy. When the Soviet vessel failed to surface, destroyers began dropping training depth charges. Unlike in The Bedford Incident, the Americans were not aware that the B-59 was armed with a T-5 nuclear torpedo. As the B-59 had been out of contact with Moscow for several days and was running too deep to monitor civilian radio broadcasts, the Soviet captain thought World War III might have started and wanted to launch the weapon, but he was overruled by his flotilla commander, Vasili Arkhipov, who was using the sub as his command vessel. After an argument, it was agreed that the submarine would surface and await orders from Moscow. It was not until after the fall of the Soviet Union that the existence of the T-5 torpedo and how close the world came to nuclear conflict became known.

See also
 On the Beach – a 1959 film about the last American submarine following a global nuclear war.
 Fail Safe'' – a 1964 film concerning the accidental launch of a nuclear first strike by the USAF

Notes

Books

References

External links
 
 
 
 
 

1960s thriller films
1965 directorial debut films
1965 films
American black-and-white films
American thriller films
British black-and-white films
British thriller films
Cold War submarine films
Columbia Pictures films
1960s English-language films
Films about nuclear war and weapons
Films about the United States Navy
Films about World War III
Films based on American novels
Films based on military novels
Films based on Moby-Dick
Films directed by James B. Harris
Films with screenplays by James Poe
1960s American films
1960s British films